The Lighthouse of Ponta dos Capelinhos, or alternately Lighthouse of Capelinhos, is a former beacon/lighthouse located along the coastal peninsula of Ponta dos Capelinhos and Costa Nau, in the civil parish of Capelo, on the island of Faial in the Portuguese archipelago of the Azores. Constructed in the late 19th century, it is an iconic symbol on the island, for the eruption of Capelinhos volcano, which occurred in 1957–58.

History

Work on the lighthouse began on 18 April 1894, but for many years the necessity of constructing a beacon on the tip of Faial had been advocated by navigators, officials and public opinion, who: " complained to the Government that some lights were need along the islands coast to indicate to navigation that crossed these waters their proximity to land, the loss that [might] occur or the choices to make." The number of incidents in this region reached a grande scale by the end of the 19th century, with more traffic, but records went as far back as 1678.

In the second half of the 19th century, more specifically 1883 and 1884, presentations had been made the Faialense Sociedade de Geografia (Geographic Society of Portugal) and Municipal Council, presided by João José da Graça, to establish two lighthouses on the island (at Capelinhos and Ribeirinha). Still within this decade, Progressive deputy Miguel António da Silveira received authorization that the construction of the first of these lighthouses would be undertaken, but there were no promises or timelines.

What is certain, is that a Lighthouse Commission did study the elaboration of an "illumination plan" for the archipelago. But, this commission had gotten bogged-down in the issues of budget, changes in government and lack of political will. In the local newspaper, opinions from the Portuguese marines, José de Almeida de Ávila (brother of the Count of Ávila) and Domingos Tasso de Figuerido were bantered about. These considerations, along with the Lighthouse Commission proposal were presented in May 1892 to the Ministry of Public Works, and a decision to invest 15 contos de reis was released in April 1894. Elections, on 29 April of the same year, saw Progressive candidates attack the Regenerator plans of José de Almeida de Ávila, stating that "shortly the fiasco of the works on the lighthouse of Capelinhos. After starting the election on 29th day, summer quickly ends the work." Although government candidates were defeated (and José de Almeida de Ávila was forced to resign) the work continued, and the lighthouse eventually inaugurated on 1 August 1903.

The work necessary to begin constructing a lighthouse began on 1 April 1894.

By July 1903 the edifice was in a state of completion.

Capelinhos

On 10 October 1957, during a period of repairs by the Directorate for Public Works, for the district of Horta, under the supervision of the Direcção-Geral dos Edifícios e Monumentos Nacionais (DGEMN) and Direcção dos Serviços de Conservação, the director of the Directorate informed by telegraph the suspension of activities due to the eruption of the Capelinhos volcano.

The first report by directing engineer of Public Works (Frederico de Menezes Avelino Machado) occurred on 7 November 1957, to the 
director of the DGEMN, over the impact of the eruption on the lighthouse. Included in the report was a unique moment in the contemporary history of the archipelago: 
On 29 September, the intensity increased and became highly explosive. The column of water vapor reached  in height and exceptionally even more. The violence of the eruption continued for a month. This was the aspect more harmful of the eruption. The quantity of ash fell on land dependent on the direction of the wind. The populations were evacuated. The torrential rainfall that fell was another disastrous factor in the region. On 29 October the small island became submerged and it appeared that the activity had terminated. But within the following days it continued, it is unclear whether the activity will return and attain the anterior violence...The rocks expelled by the volcano fell on the buildings of the lighthouse of Capelinhos, puncturing the tile and pavements and breaking glass, sanitary wares and some furniture. The lighthouse had to be closed during the eruption and the personnel evacuated. The work that was in course was, therefore, suspended. The ash and rainfall seaped into the holes in the roof and windows and accumulated in almost all the rooms, damaging the interior floors and paintings. This description was also accompanied by a photographic journal with regists, captions and dated, to illustrate the more important moments of the event between September and November 1957.

Owing to the eruption of the Capelinhos volcano the lighthouse ceased to operate on 29 November 1957.

On 30 April 1958, a new report by Frederico de Menezes Avelino Machado, accompanied by seven photographic entries, in which he described what had occurred since the last report: 
"Since the volcanic activity decreased in November and December, the main breakdowns [onsite] were repaired by the Directorate for Lighthouses and in part by the Direcção-Geral dos Edifícios e Monumentos Nacionais, who executed emergency repairs to the tune of 49.611$50 [Portuguese escudo|escudos] to the buildings in order to resist the inclement weather caused by the eruption that persisted for months. In January ashed fell again and (from the Direcção de Obras Públicas) funds were realized (20 contos) to maintain the roofs clean, of which 11.109$00 were spent...In February and March, the eruption had an unexpected development. Many the rocks damaged the buildings, piercing the fibrocement roof. The roofs of the residences fell in and the reinforced concrete slab in the machine building was ruined. There is actually in the lighthouse courtyard ash with a layer of  approximately and this number continues to increase. It was possible with funds received to remove furniture and machinery (work that was completed by personnel from the lighthouse)...In wake of what has occurred, it appears that no further funds should be spent on the lighthouse until the eruption ends. The tower still maintains itself in reasonable conditions, but the volcanic cone, [now] actually  is increasing a lot, that maybe we will need to review the future location of the lightouse."

See also

 List of lighthouses in Portugal

Capelinhos Ocean Tours

References
Notes

Sources
 
 
 
 
 
 
 
 

Lighthouses completed in 1903
Ponta Capelinhos
Buildings and structures in Horta, Azores